Richard Patrick Tracey,  (8 February 1943 – 19 March 2020), was a British Conservative Party politician, journalist and news presenter. He was the Member of Parliament for Surbiton from 1983 to 1997, and served as Minister for Sport between 1985 and 1987. He later became a Member of the London Assembly, in which he represented the constituency of Merton and Wandsworth, from 2008 to 2016, when he retired. He was the Deputy Leader of the London Assembly's Conservative group.

Early life and education
Tracey was educated at King Edward VI Grammar School, Stratford-upon-Avon, and studied law at the University of Birmingham, graduating with an LLB (Hons) degree.

From 1964 to 1966, Tracey was a leader writer for the Daily Express. From 1966 to 1978, he worked as a presenter and reporter for the BBC, involved in major TV and radio current affairs programmes and documentaries. He was a public affairs consultant between 1978 and 1983, and between 1997 and 2008. He was the author of World of Motor Sport (with Richard Hudson-Evans), published in 1971, and Hickstead – The First Twelve Years (with Michael Clayton), published in 1972.

After unsuccessfully contesting Northampton North in October 1974, he became chairman of Putney Conservative Association, then Deputy Chairman of the Greater London Area of the Conservative Party. He was President of Tooting Conservative Association.

Political career

Parliament
Tracey was Member of Parliament (MP) for Surbiton from 1983 until 1997, when the constituency was abolished owing to boundary changes. He served as Environment and Sports Minister combatting football hooliganism from 1985 to 1987, opposing sports sponsorship by tobacco companies, and was a main supporter of the National Lottery from 1991 to 1992; a member of the Select Committee for Televising the House from 1987 to 1989; and on the Public Accounts Committee from 1993 to 1997. He was Chairman of the London Conservative MPs Group from 1990 to 1997. At the 1997 general election, he unsuccessfully contested Kingston and Surbiton. He was on the Executive Committee of the Association of Former Members of Parliament.

London Assembly
In 2008, Tracey was elected a Member of the London Assembly representing Merton and Wandsworth, later becoming Deputy Leader of the Conservative Group and Conservative lead on transport. He campaigned to tighten the law on London transport strikes and celebrated the completion of the Overground rail line to Clapham Junction as well as striving to reduce pollution from buses and HGVs in Putney High Street and elsewhere. He also worked on extending the Wimbledon Tramlink to Morden and St Helier. He was Vice-Chairman of the London Fire and Emergency Planning Authority (2010–2012), and Member of the Metropolitan Police Authority (2008–10). In 2008, he was appointed Mayor's Ambassador for the River by Mayor Boris Johnson, in which he pushed successfully to extend the fast river transport service upstream to Putney in 2013 and got new piers at Vauxhall, Battersea Reach and Battersea Power Station. He was Chairman of the London Waste and Recycling Board from 2012 to 2016, with strategies to increase London recycling. He retired in 2016, and his former Merton and Wandsworth seat was then won by Labour's Leonie Cooper.

Tracey was a Freeman of the City of London from 1984 onwards, a Freeman of the Company of Watermen and Lightermen, President of Kingston Regatta, and of Kingston RFC, a Justice of the Peace, and a Fellow of the Industry and Parliament Trust from 1985.

Controversies
The role and extent of non-party organisations in social media advertising during the UK general election of 2019 was examined by BBC journalist Rory Cellan-Jones. Tracey was identified as the sponsor of a Facebook advert, which opposed the Labour Party's 2019 pledge to remove charitable status and tax exemptions from private schools in the United Kingdom.

Personal life
His wife Katharine Tracey, formerly Katharine Gardner, became a senior councillor on Wandsworth London Borough Council for 29 years, and received the OBE for services to education. They have four children and eight grandchildren.

Tracey died peacefully at home on 19 March 2020, aged 77.

References 

 Times Guide to the House of Commons, Times Newspapers Limited, 1997

External links 
 

1943 births
2020 deaths
Conservative Party (UK) MPs for English constituencies
UK MPs 1983–1987
UK MPs 1987–1992
UK MPs 1992–1997
Alumni of the University of Birmingham
People educated at King Edward VI School, Stratford-upon-Avon
Conservative Members of the London Assembly
English justices of the peace